Nina Hagen Band EP is a compilation of tracks by the Nina Hagen Band. The tracks are taken from the Nina Hagen Band and Unbehagen albums.

Track listing 

 "TV-Glotzer (White Punks on Dope)" - 5:29
 "Superboy" - 4:02
 "African Reggae" - 4:10
 "Wir Leben Immer...Noch (Lucky Number)" - 4:54

References

1980 debut EPs
Nina Hagen albums